Phoenix Crossland (born 7 July 2000) is a professional rugby league footballer who plays as a  or  for the Newcastle Knights in the NRL.

Background
Crossland was born in Wellington, New Zealand, and moved to Newcastle, New South Wales, Australia with his family as a child. 

He played his junior rugby league for the Erina Eagles, before being signed by the Newcastle Knights.

Playing career

Early years
In 2018, Crossland captained the Newcastle S. G. Ball Cup team and played 9 games for their Jersey Flegg Cup team. In November 2018, he re-signed with the Newcastle outfit on a three-year contract until the end of 2021.

2019
In 2019, Crossland played most of his football for the Knights' Canterbury Cup NSW side. On 1 July, he was named 20th man for the New South Wales under-20s side. In round 16 of the 2019 NRL season, he made his NRL debut for the Newcastle club, in a loss to the New Zealand Warriors, becoming the first person to play for Newcastle born in the 2000s.

2020
Crossland made six appearances for Newcastle in the 2020 NRL season as the club reached the finals for the first time since 2013.

2021
Crossland made nine appearances for Newcastle in the 2021 NRL season as the club reached the finals for a second consecutive year. Crossland did not feature in the club's elimination final loss to Parramatta.

2022
Crossland made a total of 19 appearances for Newcastle in the 2022 NRL season scoring one try as the club finished 14th on the table.

References

External links
Newcastle Knights profile

2000 births
Australian rugby league players
New Zealand emigrants to Australia
Newcastle Knights players
Rugby league halfbacks
Rugby league five-eighths
Rugby league players from Wellington City
Living people